Minkui Luo is a biochemist and professor of biochemistry at Memorial Sloan Kettering Cancer Center. His research interests include chemical biology and the study of posttranslational modifications in epigenetic signaling, with an emphasis on protein methyltransferases.

Education 
Luo attended college at Fudan University and earned his PhD in Bioorganic and Bioinorganic Chemistry in 2005 from Princeton University, where he worked in the lab of Professor John T. Groves.

Career and research 
From 2005-2008, Luo pursued postdoctoral studies at the Albert Einstein College of Medicine in the lab of Professor Vern Schramm. In 2008, Luo became a faculty member in the department of Molecular Pharmacology and Chemistry at Memorial Sloan Kettering Cancer Center. His group has pioneered the use of chemical genetic 'bump-hole' methodologies to identify the substrates of protein methyltransferases, an approach that requires engineering these enzymes to use a non-natural S-adenosyl methionine analogue as a cofactor. Luo's lab also has contributed to the development of new chemical probes of protein methyltransferases, enabling their function to be probed in vitro and in cells.

Notable papers 
Web of Science lists 77 publications authored by Luo in peer-reviewed scientific journals that have been cited over 2000 times, leading to an h-index of 23. His lab's five most cited papers (>80 each) are:

Awards and honors 

 2015 - Eli Lilly Award in Biological Chemistry
 2014 - Clinical & Translational Science Center Novel Award, Weill Cornell Medical College 
 2011 - Basil O'Connor Starter Scholar, March of Dimes Birth Defects Foundation 
 2010 - NIH Director’s New Innovator Award (DP2)
 2009 - The V Scholar Award, the V Foundation for Cancer Research

References 

Fudan University alumni
Princeton University alumni
Memorial Sloan Kettering Cancer Center faculty
Albert Einstein College of Medicine alumni
Chinese molecular biologists
Year of birth missing (living people)
Living people